mSpy is a brand of mobile and computer parental control monitoring software for iOS, Android, Windows, and macOS. The app allows users to monitor and log activity on the client device.

History 
mSpy was launched as a product for mobile monitoring in 2010 by a London-based tech company.

In 2012, the application allowed parents to monitor not only smartphones but also computers - Windows and Mac.

By 2014, the business grew nearly 400%, and the app's user numbers exceeded the 1 million mark.

In 2016, mLite, a light version of mSpy, became available from Google Play.

In 2015 and 2018, mSpy was the victim of data breaches which released user data.

Reception 
It was noted that since MSpy runs inconspicuously, there is risk of the software being used illegally. mSpy was called "terrifying" by The Next Web and was featured in NPR coverage of spyware used against victims of stalking and other domestic violence.

In May 2015, Brian Krebs claimed that mSpy was hacked, leaking personal data for hundreds of thousands of users of devices with mSpy installed. mSpy claimed that there was no data leak, but that instead, it was the victim of blackmailers

In September 2018, Brian Krebs claimed and demonstrated that anyone could easily gain access to the mSpy database containing data for millions of users.

See also
 Parental controls
 Spyware

References

links

2011 establishments in England
Mobile technology companies
Mobile applications
Stalkerware